George Eardley Gibson (29 August 1912 – 30 December 1990) was an English professional footballer who played as an inside left. Gibson was an early pioneer of British overseas footballers, playing in the French Ligue 1 in the inter-war years. Gibson eventually went on to play football in four countries, including his native England. Whilst Gibson played professionally in England and France and played in the Football League and Ligue 1 he was never capped internationally.

Early career

Born in Biddulph, Staffordshire, Gibson began his career with Kidderminster Harriers before being released and joining Frickley Colliery who gave him the opportunity to play regularly in the Midland League. In 1932 he signed professionally for Sunderland where he made two appearances in the Football League First Division before moving to Leicester City, for whom he also played in the Football League.

Foreign career

In 1935 Gibson became one of the early English professional footballers to play abroad when he signed for Valenciennes, who had just been promoted to the top division in French football. After a year in France Gibson moved on to clubs in Northern Ireland and Ireland before returning to France to join RC Roubaix, who had just secured top-flight football.

Return to England

Towards the end of his career Gibson joined Workington, where he also represented the cricket club as a fast bowler and batsman and briefly returned to the Football League with Bradford City where he made three league appearances.

Sources

References

1912 births
1990 deaths
Footballers from Stoke-on-Trent
People from Biddulph
English footballers
Association football inside forwards
Kidderminster Harriers F.C. players
Frickley Athletic F.C. players
Sunderland A.F.C. players
Leicester City F.C. players
Valenciennes FC players
Lisburn Distillery F.C. players
Shelbourne F.C. players
Workington A.F.C. players
Bradford City A.F.C. players
Midland Football League players
English Football League players
Ligue 1 players
English expatriate footballers
Expatriate footballers in France